Roccella may refer to:

 Roccella Valdemone, a municipality in Sicily, Italy
 Roccella Ionica (or Roccella Jonica), a municipality in Calabria, Italy
 The lichen genus Roccella, known for the species Roccella tinctoria among others

See also 
 Roccellaria